The 1990 Vuelta a Andalucía was the 36th edition of the Vuelta a Andalucía cycle race and was held on 6 February to 11 February 1990. The race started in Marbella and finished in Granada. The race was won by Eduardo Chozas.

General classification

References

Vuelta a Andalucia
Vuelta a Andalucía by year
1990 in Spanish sport